Hubert Allison Allen (April 4, 1872 – May 14, 1942) was an American general who served during World War I.  He is strongly associated with the Iowa National Guard.

Early life 
Allen was born in Independence, Buchanan County, Iowa, the son of Joel Oliver Allen and Mary Jane (McGary) Allen. He graduated from Iowa State College in Ames, Iowa in 1892.

Military career 
On  April 26, 1898 Allen enlisted with the 49th Iowa Volunteer Infantry. He served in Havana, Cuba from December 19, 1898 to April 1899 where he took the surrender of and occupied the forts guarding Havana. While in Cuba, he was twice the provost-marshal of the Seventh Army Corps. In Savannah, Georgia, Allen was honorably discharged as a captain on May 13, 1899.

For twenty-five years, he was actively identified with the Iowa National Guard. On June 26, 1915, he was made brigadier general, Iowa National Guard, for service on the Mexican border. On August 4, 1917 he was promoted to brigadier general (National Army) and given command of the 67th Infantry Brigade, 34th Division, at Camp Cody, in New Mexico. Allen was acting commander of the 34th Division in December 1917 and from August to October 1918.

He also served in France from September 15, 1918 to April 30, 1919, where he graduated from the general officer school in Langres. He also commanded the 56th Infantry Brigade, 28th Infantry Division, of the Pennsylvania National Guard troops while in France.
 
Allen was discharged as a brigadier general (National Army) on May 15, 1919, but was then commissioned a colonel. After coming back from France, he had two years of duty in the Philippines commanding a regiment of Philippine Scouts and was sent to Panama to command the 14th Infantry. After returning to the United States, he served as a senior instructor to the Oregon National Guard until his retirement on September 30, 1935.

Civilian career
In his civilian life, he was the manager of the Iowa Telephone Company.

Community and political involvement 
Allen belonged to the United Spanish War Veterans, the Knights of Pythias, the Masons, and was a Republican.

Allen served as a Vice President in the Iowa Rifle Association in 1914.

Death and legacy
Hubert Allison Allen died in Portland, Oregon on May 15, 1942.

His papers are held by Lewis & Clark College Aubrey Watzek Library Archives & Special Collections, Portland, Oregon.

References

Bibliography 
Davis, Henry Blaine. Generals in Khaki. Raleigh, NC: Pentland Press, 1998.  
Marquis Who's Who, Inc. Who Was Who in American History, the Military. Chicago: Marquis Who's Who, 1975.  

1872 births
1942 deaths
United States Army generals
American Freemasons
People from Independence, Iowa
United States Army generals of World War I
Iowa State University alumni
Military personnel from Iowa